Afroedura halli, also known commonly as Hall's flat gecko or the inland rock gecko, is a species of gecko, a lizard in the family Gekkonidae. The species is endemic to South Africa.

Etymology
The specific name, halli, is in honor of Charles Hall who collected the holotype.

References

Further reading
Branch, Bill (2004). Field Guide to Snakes and other Reptiles of Southern Africa. Third Revised edition, Second impression. Sanibel Island, Florida: Ralph Curtis Books. 399 pp. (Afroedura halli, p. 233 + Plate 107).
Hewitt J (1935). "Some new forms of batrachians and reptiles from South Africa". Records of the Albany Museum 4: 283–357. (Oedura halli, new species, p. 321).

halli
Endemic reptiles of South Africa
Taxa named by John Hewitt (herpetologist)
Reptiles described in 1935